The Palestinian insurgency in South Lebanon was a conflict initiated by Palestinian militants based in South Lebanon upon Israel from 1968 and upon Christian Lebanese factions from the mid-1970s, which evolved into the wider Lebanese Civil War in 1975 and lasted until the expulsion of the Palestine Liberation Organization from Lebanon in the 1982 Lebanon War. Although the PFLP-GC and some other Palestinian factions continued low-level military activities on Lebanese soil, after 1982 the conflict is considered to have faded in favor of local inter-Lebanese Mountain War and the Israel–Hezbollah conflict.

The South Lebanon Palestinian insurgency, which peaked through the 1970s, claimed thousands of Israeli, Lebanese and Palestinian military and civilian lives, and is considered among the key elements to start the Lebanese Civil War.

History

PLO militancy begins
From 1968 onwards, the Palestine Liberation Organization (PLO) began conducting raids from Lebanon into Israel, while Israel began making retaliatory raids into Lebanon and encourage the Lebanese factions to deal with the Palestinian fedayeen. After an Israeli airline was machine-gunned by Palestinian militants at Athens Airport, Israel bombed the Beirut International Airport in retaliation, destroying 13 civilian aircraft.

The unarmed citizenry could not expel the armed foreigners, while the Lebanese army was too weak militarily and politically. The Palestinian camps came under Palestinian control after a series of clashes in 1968 and 1969 between the Lebanese military and the emerging Palestinian guerrilla forces. In 1969 the Cairo Agreement guaranteed refugees the right to work, to form self-governing committees, and to engage in armed struggle. "The Palestinian resistance movement assumed daily management of the refugee camps, providing security as well as a wide variety of health, educational, and social services."

On 8 May 1970, a PLO faction called the Democratic Front for the Liberation of Palestine (DFLP) crossed into Israel and carried out the Avivim school bus massacre.

Black September and relocation to South Lebanon

In 1970, the PLO attempted to overthrow a reigning monarch, King Hussein of Jordan, and following his quashing of the rebellion in what Arab historians call Black September, the PLO leadership and their troops fled from Jordan to Syria and finally Lebanon, where cross-border violence increased.

Insurgency peaks through 1970s

With headquarters moved to Beirut, PLO factions recruited new members from the Palestinian refugee camps. South Lebanon was nicknamed "Fatahland" due to the predominance there of Yasser Arafat's Fatah organization. With its own army operating freely in Lebanon, the PLO had created a state within a state. By 1975, more than 300,000 Palestinian displaced persons lived in Lebanon. Aside from being used as an operation base for raids on Israel and against Israeli institutions across the world, the PLO and other Palestinian militant organizations also began a series of airplane hijack operations, targeting Israeli and international flights, carrying Israelis and Jews. The more profound effect on Lebanon was destabilization and increasing sectarian strife, which would eventually deteriorate into a full-blown civil war.

In reaction to the 1972 Munich massacre, Israel carried out Operation Spring of Youth. Members of Israel's elite Special Forces landed by boat in Lebanon on 9 April 1973, and with the aid of Israeli intelligence agents, infiltrated the PLO headquarters in Beirut and assassinated several members of its leadership.

In 1974, the PLO altered its focus to include political elements, necessary for a dialogue with Israel. Those who insisted on a military solution left to form the Rejectionist Front, and Yassir Arafat took over the PLO leadership role.

The Popular Front for the Liberation of Palestine – General Command, which split from the PLO in 1974, carried out the Kiryat Shmona massacre in April of that year. In May 1974, the DFLP crossed again into Israel and carried out the Ma'alot massacre.

Lebanese Civil War (first phase)

The Lebanese Civil War (1975–1990) was a complex conflict in the form of various factions and shifting alliances between and among Lebanese Maronite Catholics, Lebanese Muslims, Palestinians, Lebanese Druze, and other non-sectarian groups. Governmental power had been allotted among the different religious groups by the National Pact based partially on the results of the 1932 census. Changes in demographics and increased feelings of deprivation by certain ethnic groups, as well as Israeli–Palestinian clashes in the south of the country all contributed to the outbreak of the Lebanese Civil War.

Beginning in May 1976, Israel supplied the Maronite militias, including the Lebanese Forces, led by Bachir Gemayel, with arms, tanks, and military advisers. The border between Israel and Lebanon was at this time was nicknamed the Good Fence.

Fearing loss of commercial access to the port of Beirut, in June 1976 Syria intervened in the civil war to support the Maronite dominated government, and by October had 40,000 troops stationed within Lebanon. The following year, however, Syria switched sides and began supporting the Palestinians.

On 11 March 1978, eleven PLO militants made a sea landing in Haifa, Israel, where they hijacked a bus, full of people, killing those on board in what is known as the Coastal Road massacre. By the end of the day, nine hijackers and 37 Israeli civilians were killed. In response, on 14 March 1978, Israel launched Operation Litani occupying southern Lebanon, except for the city of Tyre, with 25,000 troops. The objective was to push the PLO away from the border and bolster a Lebanese Christian militia allied with Israel, the South Lebanese Army (SLA).

On 22 April 1979, Samir Kuntar and three other members of the Palestine Liberation Front, a sometimes faction of the PLO, landed in Nahariya, Israel from Tyre, Lebanon by boat. After killing a police officer, who had discovered their presence, they took a father and his daughter hostage in an apartment building. After fleeing with the hostages from police back to the beach, a shootout killed one policeman and two of the militants. Kuntar then executed the hostages before he and the remaining invader were captured.

In April 1981, the United States tried to broker a cease-fire in southern Lebanon among Israel, Syria and the PLO. In July 1981, Israel responded to PLO rocket attacks on northern Israeli settlements by bombing PLO encampments in southern Lebanon. United States envoy Philip Habib eventually negotiated a shaky cease-fire that was monitored by UNIFIL.

1982 war
The 1982 Lebanon war began on 6 June 1982, when Israel invaded again in direct retaliation over the assassination attempt by ANO (Abu Nidal organization), a splinter group from Fatah) on Shlomo Argov, the Israeli ambassador to the UK, attacking Palestinian military bases and refugee camps affiliated with Palestine Liberation Organization and other Palestinian military movements, including the ANO. During the conflict, over 17,000 Lebanese were killed, and the Israeli army laid siege to Beirut. During the war, fighting also occurred between Israel and Syria. The United States, fearing a widening conflict and the prestige the siege was giving PLO leader Yasser Arafat, got all sides to agree to a cease-fire and terms for the PLO's withdrawal on 12 August. The predominantly Muslim Multinational Force in Lebanon arrived to keep the peace and ensure PLO withdrawal. Arafat retreated from Beirut on 30 August 1982 and settled in Tunisia.

Aftermath

PLO relocation to Tunisia

The 1982 Israeli invasion in support of Lebanese Christian militias resulted in the Palestine Liberation Organization's (PLO) departure from Lebanon to Tunisia. The creation of Security Zone in South Lebanon has benefited civilian Israeli population as Galilee suffered lesser violent attacks (dozens civilians killed), than previously by PLO in the 1970s (hundreds of Israeli civilian casualties). The relocation of PLO bases to Tunisia resulted in deterioration of the Israeli-Tunisian ties, which had previously considered relatively tolerant.

Israel-Hezbollah conflict

Despite this Israeli success in eradicating PLO bases and partial withdraw in 1985, the Israeli invasion had actually increased the severity of conflict with local Lebanese militias and resulted in the consolidation of several local Shia Muslim movements in Lebanon, including Hezbollah and Amal, from a previously unorganized guerrilla movement in the south. Over the years, military casualties of both sides grew higher, as both parties used more modern weaponry, and Hezbollah progressed in its tactics. By the early 1990s, Hezbollah, with support from Syria and Iran, emerged as the leading group and military power, monopolizing the directorship of the guerrilla activity in South Lebanon.

See also
 1958 Lebanon Crisis
 Syrian occupation of Lebanon
 Cedar Revolution
 Palestinian Fedayeen insurgency
 List of modern conflicts in the Middle East

References

 
Lebanese Civil War
Wars involving Palestinians
Wars involving Israel
20th century in Lebanon
Palestinian terrorism